Richard A. Galen (born 1946) is an American columnist, Republican strategist and former press secretary to Vice President Dan Quayle and Speaker of the House Newt Gingrich.  

Galen has frequently appeared as a guest on MSNBC, as well as NBC, ABC, FOX, and CNN, including CNN's Larry King Live.

Galen is a graduate of Mountain High School in West Orange, New Jersey and Marietta College in Marietta, Ohio. He served in both the New Jersey National Guard and the Ohio National Guard.  He and his wife, Susan, have one son named Reed.

In 2013, Galen was a signatory to an amicus curiae brief submitted to the Supreme Court in support of same-sex marriage during the Hollingsworth v. Perry case.  His son, Reed, director of scheduling for the Bush-Cheney 2004 presidential campaign, also signed the brief.

References

External links
 Rich Galen biography provided by MS&L
 Rich Galen biography provided by the Ashbrook Center
 MULLINGS.COM An American Cyber-Column by Rich Galen
 

1946 births
Living people
People from West Orange, New Jersey
Marietta College alumni
New Jersey National Guard personnel
New Jersey Republicans
Ohio Republicans
Ohio National Guard personnel